Karl Arnold-Obrist (born 18 November 1796; died 17 December 1862, both in Solothurn) was a Swiss Catholic clergyman and bishop of the Diocese of Basel. He was ordained in 1820. He was appointed bishop in 1854. He died in 1862.

References

Bishops of Basel
1796 births
1862 deaths
People from Solothurn